The Picosa culture encapsulates the Archaic lifestyles of people from three locations with interconnected artifacts and lifestyles.  It was named by Cynthia Irwin-Williams in the 1960s for those areas: Pinto Basin (PI), Cochise tradition (CO) and San Pedro (SA), which all together is "Picosa".

The people in the dispersed locations in the American Southwest lived in similar housing, used similar burial practices and had similar lifestyles.  The artifacts from the sites demonstrate similarity in the technology used and personal material goods.  The Picosa culture has been found in the states of California, Arizona, Utah, New Mexico and Colorado.  It was the predecessor to the Oshara tradition.

References

See also
Outline of Colorado prehistory
Prehistory of Colorado

Archaic period in North America
Archaeological cultures of North America
Archaeological sites in New Mexico
Hunter-gatherers of the United States
Native American history of New Mexico
Native American history of Colorado
Prehistoric cultures in Colorado
Oasisamerica cultures